Snowsport Cymru/Wales is the national governing body of skiing and snowboarding in Wales. Its membership comprises individuals, schools, corporate sponsors and six affiliated clubs. Snowsport Cymru/Wales selects, organises and trains the Wales National Ski Squad.

Snowsport Cymru/Wales manages the Cardiff Ski & Snowboard Centre, Fairwater, Cardiff, where it is based.

References

Sports governing bodies in Wales
Organisations based in Cardiff
Wales
Skiing in the United Kingdom